Hogan Township was a township of Pope County, Arkansas. It was located in the central part of the county. Hogan Township was created between 1910 and 1920 using parts from Allen, Jackson, Liberty, Martin and North Fork Townships.

References
 United States Board on Geographic Names (GNIS)
 United States National Atlas

External links
 US-Counties.com

Townships in Pope County, Arkansas
Townships in Arkansas